Secrets is a 1922 play by Rudolf Besier and May Edginton.

The play first opened in London at the Comedy Theatre on September 7, 1922, starring Fay Compton and Leon Quartermaine.

Secrets opened in New York at the Fulton Theatre on December 25, 1922, and ran through May 1923, for 168 performances.

The play was also adapted for films released in 1924 and 1933.

London cast (partial)
Produced by John Eugene Vedrenne
Fay Compton as Lady Carlton
Doris Mansell as Lady Lessington
Margaret Scudamore as Mrs. Marlowe
Hubert Harben as William Marlowe
Bobbie Andrews as John Carlton

Broadway cast (partial)
Directed by Sam Forrest and produced by Sam H. Harris
Margaret Lawrence as Lady Carlton
Barbara Allen as Lady Lessington
Mrs. Edmund Gurney as Mrs. Marlowe
Orlando Daly as William Marlowe
Tom Nesbit as John Carlton
Allan Jenkins as Briggs
Beatrice Kay as Blanche

References

External links
 

1922 plays
Plays by Rudolf Besier
West End plays